The 1972 Mississippi State Bulldogs football team represented Mississippi State University during the 1972 NCAA University Division football season. After the season, head coach Charles Shira, who had compiled a 16–45–2 record over six seasons, stepped down and focused solely on athletic director duties.

Schedule

References

Mississippi State
Mississippi State Bulldogs football seasons
Mississippi State Bulldogs football